Sen. Joseph O. Clark House is a historic home located at Glen Campbell, Indiana County, Pennsylvania.  It was built between 1900 and 1924, and is in the Colonial Revival-style.

It was added to the National Register of Historic Places in 2011.

References

External links
[ National Register nomination]

Houses on the National Register of Historic Places in Pennsylvania
Colonial Revival architecture in Pennsylvania
Houses completed in 1924
Houses in Indiana County, Pennsylvania
National Register of Historic Places in Indiana County, Pennsylvania